Extraterrestrial Live is the third live album by American hard rock band Blue Öyster Cult, and was released in 1982. It primarily documents the band's 1981 tour in support of Fire of Unknown Origin, but also includes two tracks recorded in 1980 during the Mirrors Tour and the North American leg of Black Sabbath's Heaven & Hell Tour (dubbed The Black and Blue Tour). Midway through the 1981 Fire of Unknown Origin tour, the band fired drummer and founding member Albert Bouchard, replacing him with roadie Rick Downey.

Track listing

Personnel 
Band members
Eric Bloom – lead vocals on tracks 1-5, 7-8, 10-12, stun guitar, keyboards
Donald "Buck Dharma" Roeser – lead guitar, lead vocals on tracks 6, 13
Allen Lanier – keyboards, guitar
Joe Bouchard – bass, lead vocals on track 9
Rick Downey – drums on tracks 2-7, 9-13
Albert Bouchard – drums on "Dominance and Submission" and "Black Blade"

Additional musicians
Robby Krieger – guitar on "Roadhouse Blues"

Production
Sandy Pearlman – producer, management
George Geranios – producer, live sound, engineer, mixing
Paul Mandl – assistant engineer, editor
Rod O'Brien, Deve Hewitt – live recording engineers
Paul Stubblebine – mastering

Charts

Album

Singles
Roadhouse Blues

References

Albums produced by Sandy Pearlman
Blue Öyster Cult live albums
1982 live albums
Columbia Records live albums